Zdzisław Król (8 May 1935 in Zdziebórz – 10 April 2010) was a Polish Roman Catholic priest.

He died in the 2010 Polish Air Force Tu-154 crash near Smolensk on 10 April 2010. He was posthumously awarded the Order of Polonia Restituta.

References

1935 births
2010 deaths
Polish Roman Catholic priests
Officers of the Order of Polonia Restituta
Victims of the Smolensk air disaster